Mervin is a masculine given name of Welsh origin which means "great lord".

People with the name include:

 Mervin Field (1921–2015), American pollster
 Mervin D. Garretson (born 1923), American educator
 Mervin Heller Jr. (1947–2012), American tennis player
 Mervin Jackson (1946–-2012), American basketball player
 Mervin Kaye (born 1929), Canadian rower
 Mervin Kelly (1894–1971), American physicist
 Mervin King (1914–2008), American police officer
 Mervin Matthew (born 1985), West Indian cricketer
 Mervin E. Muller (1928–2018), American computer scientist
 Mervin C. Salazar (born 1977), Filipino writer
 Mervin C. Stanley (1857–1907), American businessman
 Mervin Vavasour (1821–1866), British engineer
 Mervin F. Verbit (born 1936), American sociologist